The Vienna Convention on Civil Liability for Nuclear Damage is a 1963 treaty that governs issues of liability in cases of nuclear accident. It was concluded at Vienna on 21 May 1963 and entered into force on 12 November 1977. The convention has been amended by a 1997 protocol, in force since 4 October 2003. The depository is the International Atomic Energy Agency.

As of February 2014, the convention has been ratified by 40 states. Colombia, Israel, Morocco, Spain, and the United Kingdom have signed the convention but have not ratified it. Slovenia has denounced the treaty and withdrawn from it to become party to the Paris Convention.

See also
Nuclear energy policy
Nuclear power
Nuclear power debate
Paris Convention on Third Party Liability in the Field of Nuclear Energy
Price-Anderson Nuclear Industries Indemnity Act

References

External links
"Vienna Convention on Civil Liability for Nuclear Damage", iaea.org.
Text.
Ratifications.

Nuclear safety and security
Nuclear liability
Treaties concluded in 1963
Treaties entered into force in 1977
1963 in Austria
Treaties of Argentina
Treaties of Armenia
Treaties of Belarus
Treaties of Bolivia
Treaties of Bosnia and Herzegovina
Treaties of Brazil
Treaties of Bulgaria
Treaties of Cameroon
Treaties of Chile
Treaties of Croatia
Treaties of Cuba
Treaties of the Czech Republic
Treaties of Egypt
Treaties of Estonia
Treaties of the Hungarian People's Republic
Treaties of Jordan
Treaties of Kazakhstan
Treaties of Latvia
Treaties of Lebanon
Treaties of Lithuania
Treaties of Mauritius
Treaties of Mexico
Treaties of Montenegro
Treaties of Niger
Treaties of Nigeria
Treaties of Peru
Treaties of the Philippines
Treaties of Poland
Treaties of Moldova
Treaties of Romania
Treaties of Russia
Treaties of Saint Vincent and the Grenadines
Treaties of Saudi Arabia
Treaties of Senegal
Treaties of Serbia and Montenegro
Treaties of Slovakia
Treaties of North Macedonia
Treaties of Trinidad and Tobago
Treaties of Ukraine
Treaties of Uruguay
Treaties of Yugoslavia
Civil Liability for Nuclear Damage
Liability treaties